Şakirpaşa is a mahalle in the Seyhan district of the city of Adana, 3 km west of the city centre. The neighborhood is situated south of the D400 state road, next to the Şakirpaşa Airport.

Governance
Şakirpaşa is a mahalle and it is administered by the Muhtar and the Seniors Council.

Demographics
The population of Şakirpaşa as of December 31, 2014 is 12,363. Most of the residents are Kurdish.

Economy
Şakirpaşa is a low-income working-class neighborhood. Most of the residents work at the factories and shops at low-paid jobs.

Sports
ABB Şakirpaşa is a handball club that promoted to the Turkish Women's Handball Super League on 21 April 2016, at the playoff finals in Ankara. The venue of Şakirpaşa is Yüreğir Serinevler Arena.

Transport
Şakirpaşa Airport is within the mahalle borders, 2 km from the residential areas.

Şakirpaşa Railway Station is 400 m north of the neighborhood, at the Sakarya mahalle, one block north of the D400 state road. The station is currently served by two regional lines and one long-distance line.

Adana Metropolitan Municipality Bus Department (ABBO) has bus routes from downtown Adana to Şakirpaşa. Şakirpaşa Minibus Co-operative also conducts local transport from downtown.

References

Neighborhoods/Settlements in Adana